Lothar Forcart, full name Lothar Hendrich Emil Wilhelm Forcart-Müller, abbreviated as Lothar H. E. W. Forcart, (1902-1990) was a zoologist, malacologist, and herpetologist from Switzerland.

He is commemorated in the scientific name of a species of snake, Calamaria forcarti.

References

Further reading
Wütrich M, Zilch A, Turner H (1993). "Lothar Forcart (1902-1990)". Archiv für Molluskenkunde 121 (1-6): 1-13.

1902 births
1990 deaths
Swiss malacologists
20th-century Swiss zoologists